Ziddim was an ancient city in Naphtali. It is described in the Book of Joshua 19:35 as one of sixteen or nineteen fortified cities, the others including Zer, Hammath, Rakkath and Chinnereth. This identification is not certain, and the exact location today remains unknown.

See also
 Place names in Palestine

References

Bibliography

Hebrew Bible cities
Former populated places in Southwest Asia